Podium rufipes is a species of thread-waisted wasp in the family Sphecidae. It has an average length of 19 millimeters (about 3/4 of an inch). Its body coloring is usually black, sometimes with a tint of blue, and it has red legs.

References

Sphecidae
Articles created by Qbugbot
Insects described in 1804